Western fashion in the 1920s underwent a modernization. For women, fashion had continued to change away from the extravagant and restrictive styles of the Victorian and Edwardian periods, and towards looser clothing which revealed more of the arms and legs, that had begun at least a decade prior with the rising of hemlines to the ankle and the movement from the S-bend corset to the columnar silhouette of the 1910s. Men also began to wear less formal daily attire and athletic clothing or 'Sportswear' became a part of mainstream fashion for the first time. The 1920s are characterized by two distinct periods of fashion: in the early part of the decade, change was slower, and there was more reluctance to wear the new, revealing popular styles. From 1925, the public more passionately embraced the styles now typically associated with the Roaring Twenties. These styles continued to characterize fashion until the worldwide depression worsened in 1931.

Overview 
After World War I, the United States entered a prosperous era and, as a result of its role in the war, came out of isolation onto the world stage. Social customs and morals were relaxed in the optimism brought on by the end of the war and the booming of the stock market. Women were entering the workforce in record numbers. In the United States in 1920, there was the enactment of the 18th Amendment, or as many know it, Prohibition. Prohibition stated that it would be illegal to sell and consume alcohol. This lasted until 1933, so it was a constant for the whole 1920s era. This  "noble experiment"  was intended to reduce crime and corruption, solve social problems, reduce the tax burden created by prisons and poorhouses, and improve health and hygiene. The nationwide prohibition on alcohol was ignored by many resulting in speakeasies. Another important amendment in the United States was the 19th Amendment, which gave women the right to vote. There was a revolution in almost every sphere of human activity. Fashion was no exception; women entered the workforce and earned the right to vote, and they felt liberated. Fashion trends became more accessible, masculine, and practical, creating the emergence of "The New Woman". Flappers was a popular name given to women of this time because of what they wore. The constrictive corset, an essential undergarment to make the waist thinner, became a thing of the past.

The development of new fabrics and new means of fastening clothing affected fashions of the 1920s. Natural fabrics such as cotton and wool were the abundant fabrics of the decade. Silk was highly desired for its luxurious qualities, but the limited supply made it expensive. In the late 19th century, "artificial silk" was first made in France, from a solution of cellulose. After being patented in the United States, the first American plant began production of this new fabric, in 1910. This fiber became known as rayon. Rayon stockings became popular in the decade as a substitute for silk stockings. Rayon was also used in some undergarments. Many garments before the 1920s were fastened with buttons and lacing. However, during this decade, the development of metal hooks and eyes meant that there were easier means of fastening clothing. Hooks and eyes, buttons, zippers, and snaps were all used to fasten clothing.

Vastly improved production methods enabled manufacturers to easily produce clothing affordable by working families. The average person's fashion sense became more sophisticated. Meanwhile, working-class women looked for modern forms of dress as they transitioned from rural to urban careers.  Taking their cue from wealthier women, working women began wearing less expensive variations on the day suit, adopting a more modern look that seemed to suit their new, technologically focused careers as typists and telephone operators.

Although simple lines and minimal adornment reigned on the runways, the 1920s were not free of luxury. Expensive fabrics, including silk, velvet, and satin were favored by high-end designers, while department stores carried less expensive variations on those designs made of newly available synthetic fabrics. The use of mannequins became widespread during the 1920s and served as a way to show shoppers how to combine and accessorize the new fashions. The modern fashion cycle, established in the 1920s, still dominates the industry today. Designers favored separates in new fabrics like jersey that could be mixed and matched for work and modern, informal, un-chaperoned social activities like attending films or the theater and car rides.

Women's wear

Paris set the fashion trends for Europe and North America.  The fashion for women was all about letting loose. Women wore dresses all day, every day. Day dresses had a drop waist, which was a belt around the low waist or hip and a skirt that hung anywhere from the ankle on up to the knee, never above. Daywear had sleeves (long to mid-bicep) and a skirt that was straight, pleated, hank hem, or tiered.  Hair was often bobbed, giving a boyish look.

Clothing fashions changed with women's changing roles in society, particularly with the idea of new fashion. Although society matrons of a certain age continued to wear conservative dresses, the sportswear worn by forward-looking and younger women became the greatest change in post-war fashion. The tubular dresses of the 'teens had evolved into a similar silhouette that now sported shorter skirts with pleats, gathers, or slits to allow motion. The most memorable fashion trend of the Roaring Twenties was undoubtedly "the flapper" look. The flapper dress was functional and flattened the bust line rather than accentuating it.

The straight-line chemise topped by the close-fitting cloche hat became the uniform of the day. Women "bobbed", or cut, their hair short to fit under the popular hats, a radical move in the beginning, but standard by the end of the decade. Low-waisted dresses with fullness at the hemline allowed women to literally kick up their heels in new dances like the Charleston. In 1925, "shift" type dresses with no waistline emerged. At the end of the decade, dresses were being worn with straight bodices and collars. Tucks at the bottom of the bodices were popular, as well as knife-pleated skirts with a hem approximately one inch below the knee.

In the world of art, fashion was being influenced heavily by art movements such as surrealism. Elsa Schiaparelli is one key Italian designer of this decade who was heavily influenced by the "beyond the real" art and incorporated it into her designs.

Proper attire for women was enforced for morning, afternoon, and evening activities. In the early part of the decade, wealthy women were still expected to change from a morning to an afternoon dress. These afternoon or "tea gowns" were less form-fitting than evening dresses, featured long, flowing sleeves, and were adorned with sashes, bows, or artificial flowers at the waist. For evening wear the term "cocktail dress" was invented in France for American clientele. With the "New Woman" also came the "Drinking Woman". The cocktail dress was styled with a matching hat, gloves, and shoes. What was so unique about the cocktail dress was that it could be worn not just at cocktail hours (6 and 8pm), but by manipulating and styling the accessories correctly could be worn appropriately for any event from 3 pm to the late evening. Evening dresses were typically slightly longer than tea gowns, in satin or velvet, and embellished with beads, rhinestones, or fringe.

Daywear

Skirts 
Both blouses and separate skirts went out of fashion by mid-decade, and was popular during the early years of the decade.

During 1920, the lengths of the skirt went to the ankle with a slight bow around the hips and tapering slightly to the hemline.

In 1922, skirts went off from the ankle and reached to mid-shin. And created a slightly A-lined shape by flaring out, or in a barrel-like shape by tapering around the hips. Blouses were worn often tucked in the skirt's waistbands and pulled out a few inches.

Jewelries 
In the 20s, the jewelries were not determined by the cost of materials, instead the focus was more on the design.

Accessories 
One of the key accessories in the 20s was the Cloche hat. "In 1926 Vogue stated 'The Bob Rules', just 9 years after the influential dancer, Irene Castle, cut her hair. This trending topic inspired a 1920 short story by F. Scott Fitzgerald, called Bernice Bobs Her Hair, and many editorials in Vogue throughout the decade." The bob hairstyle matched perfectly with the loose and straight silhouette of the times. During this era Vogue gave credit to this new cut for the immense success of the hat business. New haircuts meant new styled hats, therefore there was a new craze for hats. The cloche hat and the bob were basically made for each other.

Jewelry was less conspicuous.  Jewelry was much less elaborate, and began using 'romantic', more natural shapes. The Art Nouveau movement of 1890-1910 inspired most of the natural forms and geometric shapes of the jewelry during the 1920s. "Aesthetic clean lines were inspired by designs found in industrial machines. A key influence of this modernism was the influential Bauhaus movement, with its philosophy of form following function. Contrasting textures and colour were also in fashion. Examples of changing tastes in design were the use of diamonds being set against onyx or trans lucid vitrines and amethysts juxtaposed against opaque coral and jade." Even though geometric shapes and cleaner shaped jewelry were now a trend, one of the key pieces was the long rope pearl necklace. The long rope pearl necklace was a signature faux piece that was sold everywhere at the time. It was inexpensive and basic in a woman's wardrobe. "Although buffeted by cycles of boom, depression and war, jewelry design between the 1920s and 1950s continued to be both innovative and glamorous. Sharp, geometric patterns celebrated the machine age, while exotic creations inspired by the Near and Far East hinted that jewelry fashions were truly international."

Shoes were finally visible during the 1920s. Before, long garments covered up shoes, so they weren't an important part of women's fashion. Now, shoes were seen by everyone and played an important part during the 1920s. Women had all kinds of shoes for all kinds of events. Everything from house shoes, walking shoes, dancing shoes, sporting shoes, to swimming shoes. The shoe industry became an important industry that transformed the way we buy shoes today. Shoes were made in standard sizes perfect to order from fashion catalogs to the near boutique. In the beginning of the 1920s, Mary Janes were still popular from previous era, although they paved the way for the invention of many other shoes. The T-strap heel was a variation of the Mary Jane, having the same base with the addition of a strap going around the heel and down to the top of the shoe that looked like a T. Also, "The bar shoe which fastened with a strap and a single button became popular during the 1920s. It was worn with the new short skirts and was practical for their vigorous style of dancing."

The influence of jazz 
"The Jazz Age", a term coined by F. Scott Fitzgerald, was a phrase used to represent the mass popularity of jazz music during the 1920s. Both jazz music and dance marked the transition from the archaic societal values of the Victorian era to the arrival of a new youthful modernistic society. Jazz gained much of its popularity due to its perceived exoticism, from its Afro-American roots to its melodic and soulful rhythm. The music itself had quite an alluring effect on the new youthful society and was considered to be the pulse of the 1920s due to its spontaneity. With new music emerged new dancing. Jazz dances, such as the Charleston, replaced the slow waltz. Paul Whitman popularized jazz dance. In fact, jazz music and dance are responsible for the origin of the iconic term "flapper", a group of new socially unconventional ladies. When dancers did the Charleston, the fast movement of the feet and swaying of the arms resembled the flapping movements of a bird. Jazz music sparked the need to dance, and dance sparked the need for new clothing, especially for women to easily dance without being constricted.

Dances such as the Charleston and the Black Bottom in particular created a need for a revival in women's evening wear due to the dynamic and lively manner of these jazz dances. Dress and skirt hems became shorter in order to allow the body to move more easily. In addition, decorative embellishments on dresses such as fringe threads swung and jingled in sync with the movement of the body. Lastly, the use of glossy and ornate textiles mirrored light to the tempo of jazz music and dance. Jazz music and its perceived exotic nature had both a flamboyant influence on fashion while keeping both form and function in mind.

Jazz and its influence on fashion reached even further, with both jazz and dance motifs making their way onto textiles. These new textile designs included uneven repetitions and linear geometric patterns. Many textile patterns produced in the United States also incorporated images of both jazz bands and people dancing to jazz. The print Rhapsody shows a textile produced in 1925 representing a jazz band in a polka-dot like manner. Not only did textiles take motifs of people dancing and playing jazz music, they included designs that were based on the overall rhythmic feel and sound of jazz music and dance.

The boyish figure 
Undergarments began to transform after World War I to conform to the ideals of a flatter chest and more boyish figure. The female figure was liberated from the restrictive corset, and the newly popular boyish look was achieved through the use of bust bodices. Some of the new pieces included chemises, thin camisoles, and cami-knickers, later shortened to panties or knickers. These were primarily made from rayon and came in soft, light colors in order to be worn under semi-transparent fabrics. Young flappers took to these styles of underwear due to the ability to move more freely and the increased comfort when dancing to the high tempo jazz music. During the mid-1920s, all-in-one lingerie became popular.

For the first time in centuries, women's legs were seen with hemlines rising to the knee and dresses becoming more fitted. A more masculine look became popular, including flattened breasts and hips, short hairstyles such as the bob cut, Eton crop, and the Marcel wave. The fashion was seen as expressing a bohemian and progressive outlook.

One of the first women to wear trousers, cut her hair short, and reject the corset was Coco Chanel. Probably the most influential woman in fashion of the 20th century, Chanel did much to further the emancipation and freedom of women's fashion.

Jean Patou, a new designer on the French scene, began making two-piece sweater and skirt outfits in luxurious wool jersey and had an instant hit for his morning dresses and sports suits. American women embraced the clothes of the designer as perfect for their increasingly active lifestyles.

By the end of the 1920s, Elsa Schiaparelli stepped onto the stage to represent a younger generation. She combined the idea of classic design from the Greeks and Romans with the modern imperative for freedom of movement. Schiaparelli wrote that the ancient Greeks "gave to their goddesses... the serenity of perfection and the fabulous appearance of freedom." Her own interpretation produced evening dresses of elegant simplicity. Departing from the chemise, her clothes returned to an awareness of the body beneath the evening dress.

Style gallery 1920–25

Style gallery 1926–29

Menswear 

In menswear, there were two distinct periods in the 1920s. Throughout the decade, men wore short suit jackets, the old long jackets being used merely for formal occasions. In the early 1920s, men's fashion was characterized by extremely high-waisted jackets, often worn with belts. Lapels on suit jackets were not very wide as they tended to be buttoned up high. This style of jacket seems to have been greatly influenced by the uniforms worn by the military during the First World War. Trousers were relatively narrow and straight and they were worn rather short so that a man's socks often showed. Trousers also began to be worn cuffed at the bottom at this time.

By 1925, wider trousers commonly known as Oxford bags came into fashion, while suit jackets returned to a normal waist and lapels became wider and were often worn peaked. Loose-fitting sleeves without a taper also began to be worn during this period. During the late 1920s, double-breasted vests, often worn with a single-breasted jacket, also became quite fashionable. During the 1920s, men had a variety of sport clothes available to them, including sweaters and short trousers (commonly known in American English as knickers). For formal occasions in the daytime, a morning suit was usually worn. For evening wear men preferred the short tuxedo to the tail coat, which was now seen as rather old-fashioned and snobby.

Men's fashion also became less regimented and formal. Men favored short jackets with two or three buttons rather than jackets with long tailcoats as well as pinstriped suits. Casual-wear for men often included knickers, short pants that came to the knee. The most formal men's suit consisted of a black or midnight-blue worsted swallow-tailed coat trimmed with satin, and a pair of matching trousers, trimmed down the sides with wide braid or satin ribbon. A white bow tie, black silk top hat, white gloves, patent leather Oxford shoes, a white silk handkerchief, and a white flower boutonnière completed the outfit.  The tuxedo vest could be black or white, but, unlike the obligatory full-dress white tie, tuxedos ties were always black. Men usually completed their tuxedo outfit with all the same accessories as the full-dress suit, except that instead of top hats they would wear dark, dome-shaped hats called bowlers.  Just like women, men had certain attire that was worn for certain events. Tuxedos were appropriate attire at the theater, small dinner parties, entertaining in the home, and dining in a restaurant.  During the early 1920s, most men's dress shirts had, instead of a collar, a narrow neckband with a buttonhole in both the front and back. By the mid-1920s, however, many men preferred shirts with attached collars, which were softer and more comfortable than rigid, detachable collars.

Men's hats
Men's hats were usually worn depending on their class, with upper class citizens usually wearing top hats or a homburg hat. Middle-class men wore either a fedora, bowler hat, or a trilby hat. During the summer months, a straw boater was popular for upper class and middle-class men. Working-class men wore a standard newsboy cap or a flat cap.

Style gallery

Fashion influences and trends
During the 1920s, the notion of keeping up with fashion trends and expressing oneself through material goods seized middle-class Americans as never before. Purchasing new clothes, new appliances, new automobiles, new anything indicated one's level of prosperity. Being considered old-fashioned, out-of-date, or—worse yet—unable to afford stylish new products was a fate many Americans went to great lengths to avoid.

For women, face, figure, coiffure, posture, and grooming had become important fashion factors in addition to clothing. In particular, cosmetics became a major industry.  Women did not feel ashamed for caring about their appearance and it was a declaration of self-worth and vanity, hence why they no longer wanted to achieve a natural look. For evenings and events, the popular look was a smoky eye with long lashes, rosy cheeks and a bold lip. To emphasize the eyes, Kohl eyeliner became popular, and was the first time they knew anything of eyeliner (information about Egyptian fashion was not discovered until later on in the 1920s). Women also started wearing foundation and using pressed powder. Also, with the invention of the swivel lipstick, lipstick was on the rise with bright colors and they applied their lipstick to achieve a cupid's bow and "bee stung" look.

Glamour was now an important fashion trend due to the influence of the motion picture industry and the famous female movie stars. Style, at many social levels, was heavily influenced by the newly created, larger-than-life movie stars. For the first time in history, fashion influences and trends were coming from more than one source. Not unlike today, women and men of the 1920s looked to movie stars as their fashion icons. Women and men wanted to emulate the styles of Hollywood stars such as Louise Brooks, Greta Garbo, Rudolph Valentino, and Clark Gable.

Work clothes
For working class women in the 1920s, tailored suits with a straight, curve less cut were popular. Throughout the decade, the lengths of skirts were rise to the knee and then to the ankle various times affecting the skirt style of tailored suits. Rayon, an artificial silk fabric, was most common for working-class women clothing.

For working-class men in the 1920s, suits were popular. Depending on the job title and season of the year, the suit would change.  These would have featured high lapels and were often made of thick wool material before the advent of central heating.

Children's fashion
Fashion for children started to become more stylish and comfortable in the 1920s. Clothes were made out of cotton and wool rather than silk, lace, and velvet. Clothes were also made more sturdy in order to withstand play. During previous decades, many layers were worn; however, during the 1920s, minimal layers became the new standard.

For girls, clothing became looser and shorter. Dresses and skirts were now knee length and loose fitting. Shoes were also made out of canvas, making them lighter and easier to wear.

For boys, knee-length trousers were worn all year long and would be accompanied by ankle socks and canvas shoes. Pullovers and cardigans were also worn when the weather became cooler.

See also

 Cosmetics in the 1920s
 Roaring Twenties
 Flapper
 Interwar period

Notes

Further reading

 Arnold, Janet: Patterns of Fashion 2: Englishwomen's Dresses and Their Construction C.1860–1940, Wace 1966, Macmillan 1972. Revised metric edition, Drama Books 1977. 
 Black, J. Anderson, and Madge Garland, A History of Fashion, New York, Morrow, 1975
 Boucher, François: 20,000 Years of Fashion, Harry Abrams, 1966.
 Laver, James: The Concise History of Costume and Fashion, Abrams, 1979.
 Nunn, Joan: Fashion in Costume, 1200–2000, 2nd edition, A & C Black (Publishers) Ltd; Chicago: New Amsterdam Books, 2000. (Excerpts online at The Victorian Web)
 Russell, Douglas A. " Costume History and Style" Stanford University, 1983.
 Steele, Valerie: Paris Fashion: A Cultural History, Oxford University Press, 1988, 
 Steele, Valerie: The Corset, Yale University Press, 2001
 The Spirella Magazine; MAY 1928
 Children's fashion of the 1920s

External links
 1920s Fashion Plates of men, women, and children's fashion from The Metropolitan Museum of Art Libraries
 Photographs from the 1920s taken by photographer, Henry Walker at the University of Houston Digital Library 
 

1920s fashion